Radagast the Brown is a fictional character in J. R. R. Tolkien's legendarium. A wizard and associate of Gandalf, he appears briefly in The Hobbit, The Lord of the Rings, The Silmarillion, and Unfinished Tales. 

His role in Tolkien's writings is so slight that it has been described as a plot device, though scholars have noted his contribution to the evident paganism in Middle-earth. He played a more significant role in Peter Jackson's The Hobbit film series, where he was portrayed by Sylvester McCoy. Some aspects of his characterisation were invented for the films, but the core elements of his character - namely communing with animals, skill with herbs, and shamanistic ability to change his shape and colours - are all described in Tolkien's works. He is also a character in role-playing video games based on Tolkien's writings.

Appearances

Unfinished Tales explains that Radagast, like the other Wizards, came from Valinor around the year 1000 of the Third Age of Middle-earth and was one of the angelic Maiar. His original name is said to have been Aiwendil, meaning bird-friend in Tolkien's invented language of Quenya. Yavanna, one of the god-like Valar, forced Radagast's fellow wizard Saruman to accept him as a companion, which, Tolkien says, may have been one of the reasons Saruman was contemptuous of him, to the point of scornfully calling him "simple" and "a fool". However, he was an ally and confidant of Gandalf, who describes him in The Hobbit as his "cousin". He was also friends with the skin-changer Beorn, something that Gandalf relied upon to get his party of Dwarves and a Hobbit accepted by a sceptical Beorn.

Radagast lived at Rhosgobel on the western eaves of Mirkwood, its name deriving from Sindarin rhosc gobel meaning "brown village". Radagast had a strong affinity for—and relationship with—wild animals.  It is said he spoke the many tongues of birds, and was a "master of shapes and changes of hue". Radagast is also described by Gandalf as "never a traveller, unless driven by great need", "a worthy Wizard", and "honest".

In The Fellowship of the Ring, during the Council of Elrond, Gandalf tells of a previous encounter with Radagast. Radagast was unwittingly used by Saruman to lure Gandalf to his tower of Orthanc, where Gandalf was captured. Fortuitously, Radagast also helped rescue him by sending Gwaihir the eagle to Orthanc with news of the movements of Sauron's forces. When Gwaihir saw that Gandalf was imprisoned on the top of the tower he carried him off to safety. The only other reference to Radagast in The Lord of the Rings is after the Council of Elrond when scouts are sent out. It is reported that Radagast is not at his home at Rhosgobel.

The Silmarillion briefly summarizes the same events in Of the Rings of Power and the Third Age, stating that Radagast was "the friend of all birds and beasts", and noting that he innocently helped Saruman to assemble "a great host of spies" including many birds.

Etymology and origins
The in-fiction etymology, according to the essay "The Istari" in Unfinished Tales, is that the name Radagast means "tender of beasts" in Adûnaic, another of Tolkien's fictional languages. However, Christopher Tolkien says that his father intended to change this derivation and bring Radagast in line with the other wizard-names, Gandalf and Saruman, by associating it with the old language of the Men of the Vales of Anduin. No alternative meaning is provided with this new association; indeed, Tolkien stated that the name was "not now clearly interpretable". His title The Brown is simply a reference to his earth-brown robes; each of the wizards had a cloak of a different colour.

The name Radagast is found in Edward Gibbon's 1776–1789 Decline and Fall of the Roman Empire, in the form "Radagaisus", the name of a Gothic king. Slavic mythology contains a god named Radegast; this has been interpreted as "welcome guest", making him the god of hospitality. Tolkien's wizard may represent an echo of this Slavic tradition, a rare source among all the diverse influences on Tolkien's writings.

Tolkien wrote that Josef Madlener's "Der Berggeist", which shows a man in a hat seated in a forest, communing with a wild deer, inspired his Gandalf and set him thinking about the wizards Gandalf, Saruman, and Radagast.

Interpretations

Radagast appears so briefly that he has been described as a plot device for Saruman's treachery, rather than a genuine character. From the clues given, that he is a "master of shapes and a changer of hues", his friendship and communication with animals, and his skill in herbs, he resembles a shaman. He has been described as "one of the most interesting enigmas in Tolkien's writings"; given the treason of Saruman, he and Gandalf are the only two wizards available to counter Sauron, but Radagast fails to answer Elrond's call.

In a letter, Tolkien wrote that Radagast gave up his mission as a Wizard by becoming too obsessed with animals and plants. He added that he did not believe that Radagast's failure was as great as Saruman's. However, Christopher Tolkien notes that Radagast might not have failed completely, as he was specifically chosen by the Vala Yavanna for a mission to protect the plants and animals.

The Tolkien scholar Patrick Curry writes that the Slavic Radegast is the pagan patron of the Czech Beskyd mountains, depicted with a bird atop his horned helmet. In his view, this suggests that Tolkien's Radagast is one of many examples of paganism in Middle-earth.

Adaptations

In film

In Peter Jackson's The Hobbit: An Unexpected Journey, Radagast is played by Sylvester McCoy, and is expanded far beyond his brief role in the book. McCoy stated that he saw Radagast as "very otherworldly with, as Tolkien depicts him, an empathy and kinship with nature, a Middle-earth version of St Francis of Assisi". McCoy added that while Radagast was rather absent-minded, he comes out as "a bumbling hero". As for his house, McCoy said that the idea was that the tree decided to grow right through it, and Radagast agreed that he and the tree could live together. In the film, Radagast is the first wizard to visit Dol Guldur after he realizes that an evil power has infected the wood in which he lives. He discovers that a Necromancer (who turns out to be Sauron) has taken residence in the ruined fortress. In Dol Guldur he encounters the spirit of the Witch-king of Angmar, as well as the shadow of the Necromancer himself, and escapes with the Morgul blade taken from the Witch-king. Radagast's means of transportation is a sled pulled by enormous rabbits, a concept entirely original to the movie. Radagast meets Gandalf, Bilbo Baggins, and the Dwarves en route to Erebor, and tells them of his discovery in Dol Guldur. When Thorin's Company are attacked by Orcs riding Wargs, Radagast mounts his sled and provides a distraction. Later, Saruman makes contemptuous remarks about Radagast during a meeting with Gandalf, Elrond, and Galadriel. The writer Brian Sibley comments that the fact that Tolkien said little about Radagast gave Jackson's screenwriters freedom to make of the character what they liked. The Economist wrote that Radagast the Brown had been created from Tolkien's "sparse and bare" hints as to his character. The sled chase was filmed in the Strath Taieri glacial valley of New Zealand's South Island, strewn with real boulders.

In The Hobbit: The Desolation of Smaug, Radagast appears with Gandalf in a few scenes. The two wizards investigate an empty tomb, determining that the Nazgûl are once again awake and have been summoned. Gandalf bids Radagast to go and tell Galadriel of all they find, and that the White Council must make a pre-emptive move on Dol Guldur. Inside the ruins, Gandalf confronts the Necromancer and finds that he is indeed Sauron, just as Radagast had thought.

In The Hobbit: The Battle of the Five Armies Radagast arrives in Dol Guldur as the White Council battle Sauron and the Nazgûl, and carries the wounded Gandalf on his sled.

In games

Radagast features in computer and video games such as those from Games Workshop. He plays an expanded role in the massively multiplayer online role-playing game The Lord of the Rings Online, which makes him a leader in a part of Middle-earth, allowing players to interact with him.

References

Primary
This list identifies each item's location in Tolkien's writings.

Secondary

Sources

  
 
 
 
 
 
 
 
 
 

Middle-earth wizards
The Lord of the Rings characters
Literary characters introduced in 1954
Fictional shamans